Jan Nepomuk Neruda (Czech: [ˈjan ˈnɛpomuk ˈnɛruda]; 9 July 1834 – 22 August 1891) was a Czech journalist, writer, poet and art critic; one of the most prominent representatives of Czech Realism and a member of the "May School".

Early life

Jan Neruda was born in Prague, Bohemia;  son of a small grocer who lived in the Malá Strana district. Initially, they lived on  Újezd Street and later, when he was four, moved to Ostruhová Street (now called , in his honor), where they owned a house known as “U Dvou Slunců” (At the Two Suns).

His studies began in 1845 at the local Grammar school then, in 1850, continued at the Academic Grammar School in Clementinum. His favourite writers at the time were Heine, Byron, Shakespeare, Karel Hynek Mácha and Václav Bolemír Nebeský.

After graduation he tried to study law, but he failed. He worked as a clerk for a short time, but was unhappy, so he  decided to study philosophy and philology at Charles University. He then worked as a teacher until 1860, when he became a freelance journalist and writer.

He started his career at  Národní listy (National Sheets).

He became the de facto leader of a generation of writers that included  Karolina Světlá, Vítězslav Hálek, Adolf Heyduk and Karel Sabina; devoted to continuing the legacy of Karel Hynek Mácha. They published their works in the literary almanac Máj.

By 1871, various groups had labeled Neruda as a "Traitor to the Nation", so he decided to spend  some time away; visiting Italy, Greece, France, Germany, Hungary and Egypt. He kept detailed records of these journeys, which provide  an interesting testimony to his life and times, with various insights that prove him to be a good observer.

From 1883 to his death he lived on Vladislavova Street, 1382/14 in Nové Město, Prague.

Personal life
Neruda was a loner and an introvert, although he was a friend of composer Bedřich Smetana.

Neruda never married, but he had close relationships with Anna Holinová and Karolína Světlá.

Holinová was his first love. Many of his poems were meant for her. Through her father, Neruda was able to meet Božena Němcová and Karel Jaromír Erben, famous Czech nationalist writers.

His second love was Světlá, a married woman who was also a writer. They supported each other emotionally with their works. She also supported him financially. When he found himself deeply in debt, she sold a precious brooch and lent him the money. Unfortunately her husband,  found out about it and forced him to give up the relationship. He also had to give him all the letters they had written to each other. These letters became the source for the movie called Příběh lásky a cti (The Story of Love and Honor). Throughout his life, the poet had been in material need, although he was an extremely prolific and respected journalist. Once a week, for example, he wrote a column for the National Papers, worked as a theater officer and literary critic, and edited several popular science journals.

He had a close relationship with his mother. Her death in 1869 greatly affected him and brought a sadder tone to his works.

Career

In his work, Neruda supported the Czech National Revival and promoted Czech nationalism. He participated in all the central cultural and political struggles of his generation, and gained a reputation as a sensitive critic. Neruda became, along with Vítězslav Hálek, one of the most prominent representatives of the new literary trends.

Death

Beginning in 1880, he suffered from a swelling  of his veins, which contributed to a number of diseases that afflicted him for the rest of his life. In the  winter of 1888, he shattered his kneecap when he slipped on some ice. From that time on, he relied on messengers to deliver his articles to Národní listy.

He died on August 22, 1891, from an  inflammation of his digestive tract caused by intestinal cancer.

He was buried at Vyšehrad Cemetery in Prague. His funeral became the occasion for an expression of Czech nationalist sentiment.

Works

Poetry 
Hřbitovní kvítí (“Graveyard Flowers”) - His first poetry. It was published in 1858. The entire book is pessimistic, skeptical and hopeless. Verses are growing out of disappointment with contemporary life, societies, the inactivity of the Nation, resistance of the set morality. There is also a social issue, dealing with poverty. He does not trust love or people. Feelings of loneliness, fervor.
Knihy veršů (“Books of Verses”) - published in 1867. He moderates his pessimism, finds the point of his life - at work and sacrifice to the whole Nation. It shows love for his parents.This book is much more readable than other books, the poems are of good quality. Even here we find his gloomy social ballads. This book consists of three parts: 1. Kniha veršů výpravných (“Book of Narrative Verses”), 2. Kniha veršů lyrických a smíšených (“Book of Lyrical and Mixed Verses”) 3. Kniha veršů časových a příležitostných (“Book of Time and Occasional Verses”).
Písně kosmické (“Cosmic songs”) - published in 1878. In this books he is again discovering the meaning of his life, trying to be optimistic, responding to the development of science and technology. It celebrates cosmic bodies and human desire for knowledge. There is a materialistic understanding of the world. This work expresses feelings of the Generation called Májovci.
Balady a romance ("Ballads and Romances)" - published between 1878 and 1883. He confuses ballads with romances so that they often sound like the opposites. The ballads often process national themes from the Bible or old legends, and the subject of mother-son relationships appears. Some of the favourite ballads or romances are for example Romance štědrovečerní (“Christmas Romance”), Romance o Karlu IV. (“Romance about Charles IV.”), Balada česká (“Czech Ballad”) or Balada o duši K. H. Borovského (“Ballad about the soul of K. H. Borovský”).
Prosté motivy ("Plain Themes / Simple Motifs") - published in 1883. This is his intimate diary. Natural theme is really important here. The human life coincides with a cycle of seasons. Spring = youth, summer = maturity, autumn = old age, winter = death. He describes this period.
Zpěvy páteční ("Friday Songs") - published in 1896. This is his top work. This book came out after his death, prepared by Jaroslav Vrchlický. The life of the nation is compared to the Great Fate, showing the belief that the resurrection will come. It speaks of great love for the nation and reflects on national history - it turns to Hussitism. Parts of this book are V zemi kalichu (“In the country of the cup”), Anděl strážný (“Guardian angel”), Ecce homo and Láska (“Love”).

Prose 
Arabesky - This is his first book of prose, published in 1864. This is a set of short stories, whose core consists of stories from the late 1850s and early 1860s. In the forefront of these short stories there is no plot, but descriptive characteristics, reflection and dialogue. Significant is humor, irony, sarcasm. In the foreground there are peculiar figurines that are captured in contrast to the environment they are included in. These are people from the periphery that society has eliminated. Neruda uncovers their sad and tragic moments, presenting them as full-fledged, emotionally rich. This puts them in opposition to prejudice and a time of conventional view. Neruda uses his own experiences and familiar environments, gives readers only cuts from the lives of characters. Stories Měla Gusto!  and Za půl hodiny (“Within half an hour”) when sexual and erotic motifs appear at that time, they were added after Neruda's death.
Různí lidé (“Different People”) - Studies and pictures of the nature and fate of the people he met abroad.
Trhani - A novel about railroad workers.
Pražské obrázky (“Pictures of Prague”) - This book captures the lives of the poor.
Povídky malostránské (“Tales of the Lesser Quarter”) - This is his best-known prose work, published in 1877. He created the picture of Prague's Lesser Quarter before 1848 on the basis of his own memories. Neruda's stories take the reader to its streets and yards, shops, churches, houses, and restaurants. It shows typical figures of Czech Bourgeoisie. With humor depicting their qualities, he criticizes local life. It uses the form of a novelistically integrated story, sometimes its narrative consists of a series of tiny shots of everyday life. Heroes are precisely characterized, each with a different expression. It was translated into English in 1957 by the novelist and mystery writer Ellis Peters.
Praha (“Prague”)

Theatre plays 
Ženich z hladu (“Groom from hunger”)
Prodaná láska (“Sold love”)
Merenda nestřídmých
Francesca di Rimini
Žena miluje srdnatost
Já to nejsem (“It’s not me”)

Feuilletons 
Žerty hravé a dravé (“Playful and predatory jokes”)
Studie krátké a kratší (“Short and shorter studies”)
Menší cesty (“Smaller trips”)
Obrazy z ciziny (“Pictures from abroad”)

Journalism 
Obrazy z ciziny (“Pictures from abroad”)
Rodinná kronika (“Family chronicle”)

Legacy

After his death,  Ostruhová Street, which was the setting for many of his stories, was renamed  in his honor.
The Chilean poet, Ricardo Eliecer Neftalí Reyes Basoalto, adopted the pseudonym Pablo Neruda, to express his admiration.
Andrew J. Feustel took a copy of Cosmic Songs with him on space shuttle mission STS-125.
Jan Neruda Grammar School is named for him.
Statue of Jan Neruda, Prague
1875 Neruda (1969 QQ), a main-belt asteroid discovered in 1969 by Luboš Kohoutek is named in his honor.

References

External links

 
 
 
 Jan Neruda at Wikipedia (Czech) 

1834 births
1891 deaths
Writers from Prague
People from the Kingdom of Bohemia
Czech humorists
Czech journalists
Czech poets
Czech male poets
19th-century Czech musicians
19th-century journalists
Male journalists
19th-century poets
19th-century Czech writers
Burials at Vyšehrad Cemetery